Alfredo Ricci (Rome, 1864–1889) was an Italian painter, mainly painting genre pieces in watercolor.

Biography
In 1885 at Rome, he exhibited Ozio; in 1884 at Turin, he exhibited Desideri, and among other works are: Dolce far niente; Costume romano; Ciociara, and Buttero del Lazio. His painting of an organist, titled Mystical music'' (1866) is found in the Galleria Nazionale d'Arte Moderna of Rome.

References

1864 births
1889 deaths
19th-century Italian painters
Italian male painters
Italian genre painters
Painters from Rome
19th-century Italian male artists